Kevin Suarez Fernandez (born ) is a Spanish cyclo-cross cyclist. He competed in the men's under-23 event at the 2016 UCI Cyclo-cross World Championships  in Heusden-Zolder.

Major results

2011–2012
 1st  National Junior Championships
 1st Ziklokross Igorre Juniors
 1st Trofeo Ayuntamiento de Muskiz Juniors
 1st Cyclo-cross de Karrantza Juniors
 1st Cyclo-cross de Medina de Pomar Juniors
2012–2013
 2nd National Under-23 Championships
2014–2015
 1st  National Under-23 Championships
 1st Ziklokross Igorre
 3rd Cyclo-cross de Karrantza
2015–2016
 2nd National Championships
 3rd Cyclo-cross de Karrantza
2016–2017
 2nd National Championships
 2nd Trofeo San Andrés
2018–2019
 3rd Cyclo-cross de Karrantza
 3rd Trofeo San Andrés
2019–2020
 2nd National Championships
 2nd Ziklokross Igorre
 2nd Trofeo San Andres
 2nd Ciclocross Manlleu
 3rd Overall Copa de España de Ciclocross
1st Cyclo-cross de Karrantza
2nd Cyclo-Cross Internacional Ciudad de Valencia

References

External links
 Profile at cyclingarchives.com

1994 births
Living people
Cyclo-cross cyclists
Spanish male cyclists
Sportspeople from Vigo
Cyclists from Galicia (Spain)